Sedan is an unincorporated community in Kiowa County, Oklahoma, United States. A post office operated in Sedan from 1902 to 1935. The community was named after Sedan, Kansas.

References

Unincorporated communities in Kiowa County, Oklahoma
Unincorporated communities in Oklahoma